is a Japanese football player. He plays for Kyoto Sanga FC.

Career
Yutaka Soneda joined J1 League club Ventforet Kofu in 2017.

Club statistics
Updated to end of 2018 season.

References

External links
Profile at Ventforet Kofu

1994 births
Living people
Biwako Seikei Sport College alumni
Association football people from Ehime Prefecture
Japanese footballers
J1 League players
J2 League players
Ventforet Kofu players
Kyoto Sanga FC players
Association football midfielders